Mark Allen Brody (born December 6, 1951) is a Wisconsin-born Republican member of the North Carolina House of Representatives. He has represented the 55th district (including constituents in Anson and Union counties) since 2013.

Life and career
In 1996, he received his Bachelor of Arts at Concordia University, a private Christian University in Mequon, Wisconsin. Brody serves on the board of Union Day School in Waxhaw, North Carolina, a charter school launched in 2016 to serve K–3 students. The school is a tuition-free, publicly funded school run by an independent board. Brody is a formerly licensed general contractor who has built homes in Union, Mecklenburg and Gaston counties. He faced several civil suits in a decade that alleged he failed to pay for materials or services rendered, according to an WSOC-TV news report in 2012; Brody claimed the allegations were politically motivated. He is sometimes cited as having served in the US Navy (Reserves) from 1985 to 1993. His father served in the military (WWII), as did his grandfather, Joseph L. Brodowski (original surname to Brody).

Controversy
On May 11, 2018, on his Facebook page, Brody called public school teachers in Union County, North Carolina, and North Carolina "Teacher Union thugs" in relation the 2018 North Carolina teachers' rally planned in Raleigh, the state capital. Teachers' unions are illegal in the state of North Carolina. Brody defended the statement in a later interview with WBTV, saying that use of the "thug" phrase was about national unions. "When you pull the curtain away and see who’s pulling the levers on this, it’s the national teacher union and those are the ones I was referring to," he said. He also said he wasn't trying to say anything negative about local teachers.

Committee assignments

2021-2022 session
Appropriations
Appropriations - Education
Local Government - Land Use, Planning and Development (Chair)
Education - Community Colleges (Vice Chair)
Agriculture
Regulatory Reform
Wildlife Resources

2019-2020 session
Regulatory Reform (Chair)
Education - Community Colleges (Vice Chair)
Agriculture
Wildlife Resources
Education - K-12
Finance

2017-2018 session
Appropriations
Appropriations - General Government
Education - Community Colleges (Chair)
Agriculture (Chair)
Commerce and Job Development
Education - Universities
State and Local Government I

2015-2016 session
Appropriations
Appropriations - General Government (Vice Chair)
Education - Community Colleges (Chair)
Agriculture (Chair)
Regulatory Reform
Commerce and Job Development
Education - Universities
Elections

2013-2014 session
Appropriations
Agriculture
Commerce and Job Development
Government
Health and Human Services

Electoral history

2020

2018

2016

2014

2012

2008

References

External links

1951 births
Living people
People from Milwaukee
Politicians from Milwaukee
People from Monroe, North Carolina
Concordia University Wisconsin alumni
Republican Party members of the North Carolina House of Representatives
21st-century American politicians